King's Highway 81, also known as Highway 81, was a provincially maintained highway in the Canadian province of Ontario. The winding north–south route connected Highway 2 in Delaware with Highway 21 in Grand Bend, passing through Mount Brydges, Strathroy and Parkhill en route. Highway81 was first designated in 1936 and extended in 1937, and retained generally the same route throughout its existence until it was transferred to the responsibility of Middlesex County and Huron County in 1997 and 1998. Today the entire route is known as Middlesex County Road81 and Huron County Road81.

Route description 
Highway81 once served as a connecting route between Highway2 and Highway7 before its role was largely supplanted by the completion of Highway402, which generally parallels the southern half of the route. Beginning at former Highway2 in Delaware, what is now known as Middlesex County Road81 travels west through Campbellvale, Mount Brydges and Caradoc, curving slightly to the northwest. The route travels through a large swath of farmland between Caradoc and Strathroy, the latter from which it exits to the north. After crossing Highway402 at Exit65, the highway encounters former Highway 22 at Wrightmans Corners.

Continuing north, the highway takes a veering route north and west towards Parkhill, bisecting the communities of Crathie and Bornish. Immediately southeast of Parkhill, Highway81 and Highway7 shared a brief concurrency, though neither are provincial highways today.

North of Parkhill, former Highway81 continues to zig-zag north and west towards Grand Bend on the shores of Lake Huron. A onekilometre (0.6mi) section of the route between Corbett and Greenway straddles the boundary of Middlesex County and Huron County. Beyond there, the final  lay in the latter. The highway ends approximately onekilometre northwest of Highway21 at Government Road, a beach access road along the shoreline of Lake Huron.

History 
Highway81 was first established by the Department of Highways (DHO) in late-1936 to connect Highway2 at Delaware and Highway22 at Strathroy. On September16, 1936,  of roadway was assumed from Middlesex County by the DHO.

Originally, the mostly-gravel-surfaced highway passed through the community of Springbank via Springbank Road and Glasgow Street.
However, it was relocated to the southwest in 1946 to eliminate several sharp corners along the route.
It was already paved between Highway2 near Delaware and Mount Brydges, as well as between Highway7 in Parkhill and Moray when it was assumed by the DHO.
Paving between Mount Brydges and Strathroy was completed by 1950;
the section between Moray and Grand Bend was paved within the next two years.
A short section between Strathroy and Highway22 was paved by 1954.
The remainder of the route was paved by 1965, between Highway22 north of Strathroy and Highway7 east of Parkhill.
In 1969, the Parkhill Dam was constructed, creating the Parkhill Reservoir.
As a result of this work, Highway81 was diverted to the east, removing the slight jog at McGuffin Hills Drive.

As part of a series of budget cuts initiated by premier Mike Harris under his Common Sense Revolution platform in 1995, numerous highways deemed to no longer be of significance to the provincial network were decommissioned and responsibility for the routes transferred to a lower level of government, a process referred to as downloading. Highway81 was deemed to serve a local function and was transferred to Middlesex and Huron counties in two separate downloads. The section of the route between Delaware and Strathroy was transferred on April1, 1997.
The remainder of the highway, between Strathroy and Grand Bend, was transferred, on January1, decommissioning the route in the process.

Major intersections

References 

081
1936 establishments in Ontario
1998 disestablishments in Ontario